Grímsey is a small Icelandic island,  off the north coast of the main island of Iceland, straddling the Arctic Circle. In January 2018 Grímsey had 61 inhabitants.

Before 2009, Grimsey constituted the hreppur (municipality) of Grímseyjarhreppur . In that year, island residents voted to join the municipality with Akureyri. The island's only settlement is Sandvík.

Geography
Grímsey is the northernmost inhabited Icelandic territory; the rapidly disappearing islet of Kolbeinsey lies some  farther north, but is uninhabitable. The closest land is the island of Flatey, Skjálfandi,  to the south.

The Arctic Circle currently runs through the island, a feature of interest to many visitors, while the entirety of mainland Iceland lies south of the Arctic Circle. The true position of the Arctic Circle in the early 21st century is already close to the northern tip of the island, and by about the middle of the 21st century, it will no longer cross Grimsey at all. Originally a fixed monument to the Arctic Circle was placed at a conventional location. In 2017 a new monument, comprising an eight-tonne stone sphere, was placed close to the true current location of the circle, in response to its continual movement. Also, through the centuries three markers have been placed and marked with the calculated location: 1717, 1817, and 1917.

There are steep cliffs everywhere except on the southern shoreline.

Climate
Despite the northerly latitude, the climate is generally mild because of the North Atlantic Current, which brings warm water from the Gulf of Mexico. The maximum daily mean temperature in any month falls short of 10 °C, so it is within a tundra (ET) climate. The record high temperature of Brú is  registered on July 25, 1955.

Biodiversity
Though treeless, the island's vegetation cover is rich, consisting of marshland, grass, and moss, and the island is home to many birds, especially auks. Gulls and arctic terns also inhabit the island. The island has been designated an Important Bird Area (IBA) by BirdLife International because it supports large seabird breeding colonies of black-legged kittiwakes, Atlantic puffins, razorbills and common murres.

Economy and society
The principal industrial activity is commercial fishing. Agriculture and collecting seabird eggs are also common. Grímsey is a popular tourist destination for visitors seeking an Arctic Circle experience. The island is served by regular ferry and aircraft passenger services from the mainland; there is a 3,400' north–south runway on the west side of the island.

The island has acquired a reputation for being a bastion of chess-playing. On learning this, the American scholar and keen chess player Willard Fiske took an interest in Grímsey in the 1870s, sending supplies, supporting the economy and leaving money in his will, though he never visited the island.

Infrastructure
The island has a community center, a shop, a library, a public indoor swimming pool and a school from kindergarten to Grade 8. Beyond this age, students travel to Akureyri for further education. The church was formerly a parsonage, and is situated at a place marked as Miðgarður on most maps of the island; however, the single settlement is officially known as Sandvík. Grímsey has two small hotels and a campsite.

Sights
The most famous sight is the Monument to the Arctic Circle in the northern part of the island. Many visitors enjoy observing the rich birdlife on the island. The Protestant Church on Grímsey was built from driftwood in 1867 and renovated in 1956. The nave was 7.69 metres in length and 4.77 metres broad. The choir and the tower were added in 1932. The church was part of the Akureyri parish. There were four services per year. The church was completely destroyed in a fire, on the eve of September 22, 2021.

Transport
The island is served by Grímsey Airport. There are regular flights to Akureyri. A ferry connects the island three days a week with Dalvík on the mainland.

See also
List of extreme points of Iceland

References

Sources
Places along the way...Grímsey, published by Bókaútgafan að Hofi

Further reading
Jack, Robert, Arctic Living: the Story of Grimsey, [with] foreword by Vilhjalmur Stefansson, Toronto, Ont.: Ryerson Press, 1955.

External links

Grímsey Information

Populated places in the Arctic
Populated places in Northeastern Region (Iceland)
Akureyri
Important Bird Areas of Iceland
Islands of Iceland
Seabird colonies